Piratosaurus (meaning "Multiplied pirate lizard") is a dubious genus of plesiosaur possibly belonging to the Polycotylidae that is known exclusively from the type species P. plicatus, named and described by Joseph Leidy in 1865. It is known only from the holotype, USNM V 1000, a tooth, discovered in Late Cretaceous-aged rocks in the Red River basin of Manitoba; at least one researcher erroneously assumed it was found in Minnesota.

See also

 List of plesiosaur genera
 Timeline of plesiosaur research

References

Cretaceous plesiosaurs
Taxa named by Joseph Leidy
Fossil taxa described in 1865
Plesiosaurs